Fuertesiella is a genus of flowering plants from the orchid family, Orchidaceae. It contains only one known species, Fuertesiella pterichoides, native to Cuba and to the Dominican Republic.

See also 
 List of Orchidaceae genera

References 

 (1913) Symbolae Antillanae seu Fundamenta Florae Indiae Occidentalis 7: 492.
  (2003) Genera Orchidacearum 3: 37 ff. Oxford University Press.
  2005. Handbuch der Orchideen-Namen. Dictionary of Orchid Names. Dizionario dei nomi delle orchidee. Ulmer, Stuttgart

External links 

Monotypic Orchidoideae genera
Cranichideae genera
Flora of Cuba
Flora of the Dominican Republic
Cranichidinae